Philip Edward MacKenzie (January 9, 1872June 19, 1946), joined the firm McCraney & Hutchinson in 1909 as barrister which then became, McCraney, McKenzie and Hutchinson. P.E. McKenzie was an agent for the attorney general for the judicial district of Saskatoon (1911–21). The firm remained McCraney, McKenzie and Hutchinson until 1921, when P.E. MacKenzie became King's Bench Judge at Regina. He held a term of office on the University of Saskatchewan board of governors from 1920 to 1940. He became the third chancellor of the University of Saskatchewan, and served in this position until his unexpected illness and passing in 1946.

Biography
P.E. MacKenzie attended Collegiate Institute, London, Ontario. He received his BA from the University of Toronto in 1893, and an LLB in 1895. He was called to the bar in Ontario as of 1896. He later received an appointment to become the Crown attorney of Kenora District in Saskatchewan.

Mackenzie died on June 19, 1946, at Regina General Hospital, in Regina, Saskatchewan.

Other honours
The P. E. Mackenzie Entrance Scholarship was set up in his honour.

See also
 List of University of Saskatchewan alumni
 List of University of Toronto people

Notes

Canadian university and college chief executives
1872 births
1946 deaths
University of Toronto alumni
People from London, Ontario
Chancellors of the University of Saskatchewan
Judges in Saskatchewan
Lawyers in Saskatchewan
University of Toronto Faculty of Law alumni